The Job is an early work by American novelist Sinclair Lewis. It is considered an early declaration of the rights of working women. The focus is on the main character, Una Golden, and her desire to establish herself in a legitimate occupation while balancing the eventual need for marriage. The story takes place in the early 1900-1920s and takes Una from a small Pennsylvania town to New York. Forced to work due to family illness, Una shows a talent for the traditional male bastion of commercial real estate and, while valued by her company, she struggles to achieve the same status of her male coworkers.

On a parallel track, her quest for traditional romance and love is important but her unique role as a working woman, doing a man's job, makes it tough to find an appropriate suitor.

Una is on track to marry Walter Babson, who appears to be a good man but lacks the excitement of her eventual husband, Edward Schwirtz. He is a salesman with all the charm necessary to win her heart, but the marriage is doomed from the start. Una eventually determines to divorce him, which is also scandalous for the time. As the book closes, Una emerges triumphant in both her career and her personal life.

The novel was published before Lewis achieved any significant fame and provides insights on working women as well as the unique nature (for the time) of having a woman as the lead character.

External links

 

1917 American novels
Novels by Sinclair Lewis
Feminist novels
Novels set in Pennsylvania
Novels set in New York (state)
Harper & Brothers books